Joël Gaspoz (born 25 September 1962) is a Swiss former alpine skier.

Career
He competed in the slalom and giant slalom at the 1980, 1984 and 1988 Olympics with the best result of seventh place in the giant slalom in 1980. He came close to winning the gold in the giant slalom at the 1987 Alpine Skiing World Championships on home snow at Crans Montana, holding a clear lead in the second run before crashing out with three gates to go.

From 1979 to 1989, Gaspoz won one slalom and six giant slalom World Cup races.  In the 1987 Alpine Skiing World Cup, he finished first in the Giant Slalom standings, with his teammate Pirmin Zurbriggen.

World Cup victories

References

External links
 
 

1962 births
Living people
Swiss male alpine skiers
FIS Alpine Ski World Cup champions
Olympic alpine skiers of Switzerland
Alpine skiers at the 1980 Winter Olympics
Alpine skiers at the 1984 Winter Olympics
Alpine skiers at the 1988 Winter Olympics